Amaury de Montfort may refer to:

 Amaury I de Montfort (died ), lord of Montfort
 Amaury II de Montfort (died 1089), lord of Montfort
 Amaury III de Montfort (I of Évreux) (died 1137), lord of Montfort and Count of Évreux
 Amaury IV de Montfort (II of Évreux) (died 1140), Count of Évreux
 Amaury III of Évreux (Amaury V de Montfort, died 1182), Count of Évreux
 Amaury IV of Évreux (Amaury VI de Montfort, died 1213), Count of Évreux
 Amaury de Montfort (died 1241) (1195–1241), count of Montfort
 Amaury de Montfort (priest) (1242/1243 –  1300)